.bf is the Internet country code top-level domain (ccTLD) for Burkina Faso. It was introduced in 1993.

It is administered by the ARCEP since 2011. Previously it was sponsored and administered by Delegational Generale Informatique (DELGI).

See also
Internet in Burkina Faso

References

External links
A PDF version of the official registration form
ARCEP

Citations
 https://www.worldstandards.eu/other/tlds/
 IANA .bf whois information

Communications in Burkina Faso
Country code top-level domains

sv:Toppdomän#B